Master key may refer to:

 Master keying, a special type of key designed to open multiple locks
 Master Key, a pricing game on The Price Is Right
 Knight's Armament Company Masterkey, a door breaching shotgun
 One of the encryption keys used in a Master/Session encryption scheme
 Master Key (TV series), a South Korean variety show

See also
 The Master Key (disambiguation)